Jhon Eduard Murillo Romaña (born 21 November 1995) is a Venezuelan professional footballer who plays as a forward for Liga MX club Atlético San Luis and the Venezuela national team.

Club career
Murillo was born in El Nula, Venezuela. After starting his career at Fundación Atlético San Camilo FC, he moved to Unión Atlético Alto Apure. In 2012, he played in the Venezuelan Tercera División.

Murillo made his Venezuelan Primera División debut on 22 October 2012 against Llaneros de Guanare. He scored his first league goal on 19 August 2013 against Deportivo Petare.

On 20 May 2015, Zamora FC confirmed Murillo's transfer to Portuguese champions Benfica on a five-year deal.

On 16 July 2015, he joined C.D. Tondela of Primeira Liga on a one-year loan. On 30 June 2016, Primeira Liga side C.D. Nacional announced that Murillo had signed a season-long loan deal with the club, however, on 25 July, he continued on loan at Tondela for a further season. Afterwards, he was loaned out to Kasımpaşa in Turkey for one season.

International career
In 2014, Murillo helped the under-21s finish second in that year's Central American and Caribbean Games held in Mexico, scoring two goals – including the one in the semi-final against Honduras.

Murillo represented the Venezuela under-20 team in the 2015 South American Youth Football Championship in a first stage exit.

On 11 February 2015, Murillo made his debut for Venezuela in an international friendly against Honduras; he scored the winning goal in a 2–1 victory. In 2016, he was named in the 40-men preliminary list for the Copa América Centenario but he eventually was excluded from the final squad.

International goals
Scores and results list Venezuela's goal tally first.

Career statistics

Honours

Club
Zamora
 Primera División: 2012–13, 2013–14

International
Venezuela
Central American and Caribbean Games Silver Medal: 2014

References

1995 births
Living people
Venezuelan footballers
Association football forwards
Venezuela international footballers
2015 Copa América players
Zamora FC players
S.L. Benfica footballers
C.D. Tondela players
Kasımpaşa S.K. footballers
Venezuelan Primera División players
Primeira Liga players
Süper Lig players
Venezuelan expatriate footballers
Expatriate footballers in Portugal
Expatriate footballers in Turkey
Venezuelan expatriate sportspeople in Portugal
Venezuelan expatriate sportspeople in Turkey
2019 Copa América players
2021 Copa América players